HMS Sandfly was an Acheron-class destroyer of the Royal Navy that served during World War I and was sold for breaking in 1921.  She was the seventh Royal Navy ship to be named after the small biting fly of the same name.

Construction
She was built under the 1910-11 shipbuilding programme by Swan Hunter of Wallsend. She had three Parsons turbines, and three Yarrows boilers. Capable of 28 knots, she carried two 4-inch guns, other smaller guns and two 21 inch (533 mm) torpedo tubes and had a complement of 72 men. She was launched on 9 July 1911.

Pennant numbers

Career

Pre-war
Sandfly served with the First Destroyer Flotilla from 1911 and, with her flotilla, joined the British Grand Fleet in 1914 on the outbreak of World War I.

The Battle of Heligoland Bight
She was present on 28 August 1914 at the Battle of Heligoland Bight, detached from the First Destroyer Flotilla along with Badger, Beaver and Jackal. She shared in the prize money for the engagement.

The Battle of Dogger Bank
On 24 January 1915, the First Destroyer Flotilla, including Sandfly, were present at the Battle of Dogger Bank, led by the light cruiser . Her crew shared in the prize money for the German armoured cruiser .

Transfer to Third Battle Squadron
Sandfly was one of seven destroyers to go with the First Destroyer Flotilla when it was transferred from the Grand Fleet to screen the Third Battle Squadron in November 1916.

Conversion to minelayer

In 1917 the Acheron-class destroyers Ferret, Sandfly and Ariel were converted to minelaying destroyers, capable of carrying 40 mines.  Sandfly served with the 20th Flotilla, and operated out of Immingham.

SS Miniota

Disposal
In common with the survivors of her class, she was laid up after World War I, and on 9 May 1921 she was sold to Thos. W. Ward for scrap.

References

Acheron-class destroyers
World War I destroyers of the United Kingdom
Ships built on the River Tyne
1911 ships
Ships built by Swan Hunter